Halket is a Scottish surname of English (Anglo-Norman) origin.

The Halket surname originated in Renfrewshire Scotland and the family seat was at Pitfirrane Castle near Dunfermline.

Variants of Halket included : Halkett, Halkette, Halkhead, Halkhede, Hackett, Hacket, Haket amongst others.  

Notable people with the surname include:

Alex Halkett (1881–1917), Scottish footballer
Anne Halkett (1623–1699), English religious writer and autobiographer
Colin Halkett (1774–1856), British army officer
Harry Halket (1889-1935) Progenitor  of the Potteries market trading dynasty
Hugh Halkett (1783–1863), British soldier
John Halkett (disambiguation)
Sir Peter Halkett, 6th Baronet (1765–1839), senior Royal Navy officer
Peter Halkett, designer of the Halkett boat

See also
Halkett baronets
Hackett (surname)